The Our Lady of the Assumption Cathedral or simply Banjul Cathedral, is a Roman Catholic church located in Banjul the capital of the African country of Gambia.

It is located on Hagan Street, on the corner of Picton Street, which is the main street of the city. It is the slightly larger of the two cathedrals in the city (the other belonging to the Anglican Church). The church was built in the colonial era from 1913 to 1916 when Gambia was a British colony. The status of the building change over time first in 1951 was chosen to host the apostolic prefecture and then became a cathedral when the then Bathurst, in 1957 became diocese. Since then, the cathedral has been the seat of the Diocese of Banjul.

On his journey through Senegal, Gambia and Guinea, Pope John Paul II visited the Cathedral on February 23, 1992.

See also
Roman Catholic Diocese of Banjul
Our Lady of the Assumption

References

Roman Catholic cathedrals in the Gambia
Buildings and structures in Banjul
Roman Catholic churches completed in 1916
20th-century Roman Catholic church buildings